The Mescal Fire is a wildfire that started near Globe, Arizona on June 1, 2021. The fire burned  and was fully contained on June 18, 2021.

Events

June 
The Mescal Fire was first reported at around 11 am MST on June 1, 2021.

Cause 
The cause of the fire is under investigation.

Containment 
On June 18, 2021, the Mescal Fire reached 100% containment.

Aftermath

Impact

Closures and Evacuations 
The Mescal Fire has led to a number of closures and evacuations.

On June 4, 2021, the Gila County Division of Health and Emergency Management issued evacuation alerts for residents in the El Capitan area, east of State Route 77, Soda Canyon area, the community north of Route 3, Old San Carlos Junction up to Highway 70, and the Beverly Hills Community area.

References 

Wildfires in Arizona
2021 Arizona wildfires
June 2021 events in the United States